"Cherub Rock" is a song by American alternative rock band the Smashing Pumpkins. It is the first single from their second album, Siamese Dream (1993) and is the opening track. It was written by lead vocalist and guitarist Billy Corgan. It was nominated for a Grammy Award for Best Hard Rock Performance.

Composition 

"Cherub Rock" was one of the last songs written for the album, and the lyrics relate to Corgan's relationship with his perception of the indie rock community and larger media. The song was performed in standard tuning with an E octave played at the 7th fret, a technique which the band used on other songs, such as "Drown", "Tristessa", and "Starla". Corgan describes this as the "Pumpkin Chord", saying "We basically stole that from Jimi Hendrix. But Jimi Hendrix probably stole it from Wes Montgomery." The prominent effect on the solo was achieved by recording the guitar solo to two different tapes which were then run simultaneously, with the speed of one tape slightly altered. "Cherub Rock" contains various overdubs influenced by the genres of shoegazing as well as 1970s classic arena rock. According to Corgan, the song's introductory drum riff is a direct lift from Rush's 1975 song "By-Tor and the Snow Dog."

Reception 
Corgan insisted that the song be released as the first single from the album, though record executives believed that "Today" would be a stronger opening single. Although Corgan's wishes were honored, the single was indeed received much less enthusiastically than "Today", although it remains a fan favorite. An acoustic version of the song is performed on Vieuphoria and its CD companion, Earphoria.

The song was a moderate success for the band, being performed on Saturday Night Live on October 30, 1993 and making it to the Triple J Hottest 100 at number 43. Readers ranked "Cherub Rock" at number 97 in Guitar Worlds list of the 100 greatest guitar solos of all time. In March 2005, Q magazine placed it at number 67 in its list of the 100 Greatest Guitar Tracks.

Following the 2011 re-issue of Siamese Dream, Consequence of Sound commented that the single "seemed tailor-made to feed the emerging modern rock radio format."

 Music video 
The video features footage of the band performing the song live in a forest setting. It was shot outside San Francisco entirely on Super8 film on a modest budget. The director, Kevin Kerslake, employed various destructive techniques when developing the film to give the video a broken and dirty look. Corgan was reportedly extremely unhappy with the shooting experience, and the band never worked with Kerslake again.

 In popular culture 
The song features on numerous rhythm video games such as Guitar Hero III: Legends of Rock, Rock Band, Power Gig: Rise of the SixString and Rocksmith 2014.

Rochester, New York band Roses Are Red covered the song for Reignition Records' 2005 compilation The Killer in You: A Tribute to Smashing Pumpkins.

 Track listings 
All songs were written by Billy Corgan.CD and 12-inch vinyl "Cherub Rock" – 4:59
 "Pissant" – 2:30
 "French Movie Theme" / "Star-Spangled Banner" – 3:507-inch vinyl' (5000 copies only)
 "Cherub Rock" – 4:59
 "Purr Snickety" – 2:50

Personnel 
 Billy Corgan – vocals, lead guitar, bass (recording session), production
 James Iha – rhythm guitar, vocals
 D'arcy Wretzky – bass (credited), vocals
 Jimmy Chamberlin – drums

Charts

References

External links 
 
 

The Smashing Pumpkins songs
1992 songs
1993 singles
Grunge songs
Music videos directed by Kevin Kerslake
Song recordings produced by Billy Corgan
Song recordings produced by Butch Vig
Songs about the media
Songs about rock music
Songs written by Billy Corgan
Virgin Records singles